Uzhavarkarai or Ozhukarai taluk is one of four taluks in the Pondicherry District of the union territory of Puducherry. Uzhavarkarai taluk has only one sub-taluk/firka, viz. Uzhavarkarai. It consists of 8 revenue villages.

Revenue villages
There are 8 revenue villages under Uzhavarkarai taluk, viz.
 Alankuppam
 Kalapet
 Karuvadikuppam
 Oulgaret
 Pillaisavady
 Reddiarpalayam
 Saram
 Thatanchavady

All these revenue villages come under urban area, which is administered by Uzhavarkarai municipality, which is divided into 37 municipal wards.

References

External links 
 North East Monsoon 2009 - Action Plan
 Right to Information Act Manual published by Department of Revenue anggd Disaster Management, Government of Puducherry

Puducherry district
Taluks of Puducherry